Kelantan United Football Club is a Malaysian professional association football club based in Kota Bharu. The club plays in Malaysia Super League.

History
Kelantan United Football Club is a professional football club founded in 2016. Previously knows as Majlis Perbandaran Kota Bharu-Bandar Raya Islam Urusetia Belia dan Sukan Negeri Kelantan Football Club (MPKB-BRI UBeS FC) and also as Majlis Perbandaran Kota Bharu-Bandar Raya Islam Football Club (MPKB-BRI FC) enter the Malaysian football competition in 2016 when the club was accepted to compete in 2016 Malaysia FAM League. The club finished the season at the eight place.

For 2017 season, the club will compete in Malaysia FAM League and participated in 2017 Malaysia FA Cup. Starting from 2019 season, the club has been rebranded to Kelantan United Football Club as an effort to bring in local area support. In 2023, the club was promoted to the Malaysia Super League for the first time.

Crest and colours

Crest
Kelantan United has utilised one primary crest since the club participation in the national level football league competition before the club introduce a new crest starting in 2017 season in order to solidify its new branding.

Colours
Kelantan United have always worn black with mixture of red for shirts as their home kit. For 2017 season, the club play in red with a trim of white for home kit.

Kelantan United's away colours are usually white with green trim. For 2017 season, the club play in white with a trim of red for away kit while the white with a green trim for the third kit.

Ownership and finances

Sponsorship

Season by season record

P = Played
W = Games won
D = Games drawn
L = Games lost
F = Goals for
A = Goals against
Pts = Points
Pos = Final position
N/A = No answer

FAM = FAM League
M3 = Malaysia M3 League
MPL = Malaysia Premier League
MSL = Malaysia Super League

QR1 = First Qualifying Round
QR2 = Second Qualifying Round
QR3 = Third Qualifying Round
QR4 = Fourth Qualifying Round
RInt = Intermediate Round
R1 = Round 1
R2 = Round 2
R3 = Round 3

R4 = Round 4
R5 = Round 5
R6 = Round 6
GR = Group stage
QF = Quarter-finals
SF = Semi-finals
RU = Runners-up
S = Shared
W = Winners

Club top scorer

Players

First-team squad

Under-23s

Coaches
Coaches by Years (2010–present)

  Mahadi Yusof 
  Abdullah Muhammad 
  Mohd Azli Mahmood 
  Kamarudin Muhamad 
  Abdullah Muhammad 
  Zahasmi Ismail 
  Nazrulerwan Makmor 
  Akira Higashiyama 
  Syamsul Saad 
  Tomáš Trucha

Coaching staff

Honours

Domestic competitions

League
Malaysia M3 League
  Champions (1): 2019

References

External links
 Official Facebook Page

2016 establishments in Malaysia
Association football clubs established in 2016
Football clubs in Malaysia
Malaysia FAM League clubs
Sport in Kelantan
Malaysia M3 League
Malaysia Premier League clubs
Malaysia Super League clubs